Hallandale High School is a public high school and magnet school located in Hallandale Beach, Florida. The school is a part of the Broward County Public Schools district and was established in 1973.

It serves: Hallandale Beach, Pembroke Park, and West Park.

History

In 1996 Moses Barnes was to become principal of Hallandale; he was previously at Lauderhill Middle School.

Magnet programs 
Hallandale High is an All Magnet High School. The Magnet programs are broken down into three houses. The two major being Communications and International Affairs, alongside the smaller Urban Teacher Academy. Under these programs classes are based around these fields:
 Graphic Arts
 Journalism
 Broadcast
 Mechanical Engineering
 Criminal Justice
 Business
 Medicine
 Arts
 Education

Student media 
 The Lightning Times is the official student newspaper of Hallandale High School. The Lightning Times is published monthly on a print edition and is updated regularly on their student run website.
 HDTV News which is run by students with the help of faculty.

Demographics
As of the 2021-22 school year, the total student enrollment was 1,084. The ethnic makeup of the school was 32.9% White, 63.1% Black, 31.5% Hispanic, 0.5% Asian, 0.3% Pacific Islander, 3% Multiracial, and 0.2% Native American or Native Alaskan.

Notable alumni 

 Lawrence Gordon, former CFL defensive back
 Frankie Hammond, former NFL wide receiver
 Tabarie Henry, 2x Olympic sprinter
 Tyler Huntley, NFL quarterback
 Davin Joseph, former NFL offensive lineman
 Zack Moss, NFL running back
 Sydelle Noel, actress/model
 Butch Rolle, former NFL tight end
 Nancy Valen, actress

Clubs and organizations 
Hallandale has a variety of clubs for students to join. Students are welcome to create their own clubs as well. Hallandale also offers tutoring for students in mathematics, reading, and SAT/ACT prep.

Organizations include:
 Student Government Association
 National Honor Society
 SECME
 HOSA
 Business Professionals of America
 Key Club
 Drama
 Band
 Choir
 Charger Spirit Initiative
 Yearbook
 JROTC
   Debate

References

External links 
 Hallandale High School
 Hallandale High's Student Government Association
 School profile

Educational institutions established in 1973
Broward County Public Schools
High schools in Broward County, Florida
Public high schools in Florida
1973 establishments in Florida
Hallandale Beach, Florida